Hamilton South was a constituency of the Scottish Parliament (Holyrood). It elected one Member of the Scottish Parliament (MSP) by the plurality (first past the post) method of election. It was also one of ten constituencies in the Central Scotland electoral region, which elected seven additional members, in addition to ten constituency MSPs, to produce a form of proportional representation for the region as a whole.

Electoral region 
See also Central Scotland Scottish Parliament electoral region

The other nine constituencies of the South of Scotland region were Airdrie and Shotts, Coatbridge and Chryston, Cumbernauld and Kilsyth, East Kilbride, Falkirk East, Falkirk West, Hamilton North and Bellshill, Kilmarnock and Loudoun and Motherwell and Wishaw.

The region covered all of the Falkirk council area, all of the North Lanarkshire council area, part of the South Lanarkshire council area, part of the East Ayrshire council area and a small part of the East Dumbartonshire council area.

Constituency boundaries and council area 

The  constituency was created at the same time as the Scottish Parliament, in 1999, with the name and boundaries of an existing Westminster constituency. In 2005, however, Scottish Westminster (House of Commons) constituencies were mostly replaced with new constituencies.

The Holyrood constituency was one of five covering the South Lanarkshire council area, the others being East Kilbride and Hamilton North and Bellshill, which are within the Central Scotland region, Glasgow Rutherglen, within the Glasgow region, and Clydesdale, within the South of Scotland region.

Three of the five constituencies were entirely within the South Lanarkshire area. Glasgow Rutherglen straddled the boundary with the Glasgow City council area, which was entirely within the Glasgow electoral region, and Hamilton North and Bellshill straddled the boundary with the North Lanarkshire council area, which was entirely within the Central Scotland region.

The Hamilton South constituency was south of Hamilton North and Bellshill, west of Clydesdale, north and east of East Kilbride and east of Glasgow Rutherglen.

Member of the Scottish Parliament

Election results

Footnotes 

1999 establishments in Scotland
Constituencies established in 1999
2011 disestablishments in Scotland
Constituencies disestablished in 2011
Scottish Parliament constituencies and regions 1999–2011
Hamilton, South Lanarkshire
Blantyre, South Lanarkshire
Politics of South Lanarkshire